Dorycnopa is a genus of moths in the family Gelechiidae.

Species
 Dorycnopa heliochares (Lower, 1900)
 Dorycnopa marmorea (Lower, 1899)
 Dorycnopa orthodesma (Lower, 1901)
 Dorycnopa triphera Lower, 1920

References

 
Anomologini